Akçaova (literally "white plains") is a town in Çine district  of Aydın Province, Turkey. At    it is situated in the plains to the south west of Çine Creek a tributary of Büyükmenderes River. The population of Akçaova was 2289  as of 2019. The earlier name of the settlement was Akçaoba ("white tribe") referring to the nomadic Turkmen founders of the settlement in 1820s. In 1969, the settlement was declared a seat of township. Main economic activity is olive groves and cattle breeding. There is an integrated meat plant in the town.

References

Populated places in Aydın Province
Towns in Turkey
Çine District